Roddam is a surname. Notable people with the surname include:

Franc Roddam (born 1946), British film director, businessman, screenwriter, television producer, and publisher
Robert Roddam (1719–1808), British Royal Navy admiral

See also
Roddam, Anantapur district, India
Roddam, Northumberland, England
Roddon, a dried up old river bed, especially East Anglia
Roddam Narasimha (1933–2020), Indian aerospace scientist and fluid dynamicist
Rodham